Bafruiyeh District is in Meybod County, Yazd province, Iran. At the 2006 National Census, the region's population (as part of the Central District) was 8,399 in 2,296 households. The following census in 2011 counted 10,352 people in 2,803 households. At the latest census in 2016, there were 10,837 inhabitants in 3,291 households, by which time the district had been established.

References 

Meybod County

Districts of Yazd Province

Populated places in Yazd Province

Populated places in Meybod County

fa:بخش بفروئیه